Tipsport is the largest betting agency in the Czech Republic. The company was founded in 1991 in Beroun by a group of local businessmen led by Vratislav Randa, who is still a chairman of the board.  The first branch was opened in May 1991. By now, the company has almost 700 branches across the Czech Republic.  A real milestone for Tipsport was the license for internet betting in 2009. After more than 12 years, internet betting makes a 95% of all bets accepted by the company.  In 2017, when the new Czech gambling legislation was adopted, Tipsport opened an online casino named Vegas.

Sponsoring
Tipsport has sponsored the Czech Extraliga and Slovak Extraliga, as well as two Tipsport Arenas: Tipsport Arena (built 1962) and Tipsport Arena (built 2005).

References

External links
Official Website

Bookmakers
Online gambling companies of the Czech Republic
1991 establishments in the Czech Republic